Lizq is an archaeological site in Ash Sharqiyah, Oman. Located on a mountain lying in a plain, 1000 m south-east of the south-eastern edge of the Lizq palm garden, the fort dates to the Lizq-Rumaylah/Early Iron Age.

Description
The site was discovered in 1979 during the archaeological exploration of Gerd Weisgerber of the German Mining Museum (Deutsches Bergbau-Museum) in Bochum. Shaikh Hamdan al-Harthy of Samad led Weisgerber to the site. In 1981 a single season long German archaeological team mapped and conducted minimal rescue excavation. They did an ad hoc restoration of the stairs which lead up the northern face of the mountain. Since there are several sites near Lizq town, the fort is disambiguated as 'L1'.

The Lizq fort owes its existence to the reliable occurrence of water at a natural causeway at the southern side of the central mountains. The main fort on the western mountain peak is some 175 m wide and has a surface of more than 20.000 m2 in surface area. This makes it the largest Early Iron Age fort in central Oman. The location of the Iron Age village associated with the fort remains unknown. No falaj was discovered.

Important is Kroll's comparison of the pottery with that of Iron Age Iran.

See also
 Archaeology of Oman

Sources

References

External links
heidICON - Die Heidelberger Objekt- und Multimediadatenbank

History of Oman
Archaeological sites in Oman